Pentoo is a Live CD and Live USB designed for penetration testing and security assessment. Based on Gentoo Linux, Pentoo is provided both as 32 and 64-bit installable live CD. Pentoo is also available as an overlay for an existing Gentoo installation. It features packet injection patched Wi-Fi drivers, GPGPU cracking software, and many tools for penetration testing and security assessment. The Pentoo kernel includes grsecurity and PAX hardening and extra patches - with binaries compiled from a hardened toolchain with the latest nightly versions of some tools available.

Features 
 Available in 32-bit and 64-bit versions, the latter having a significant speed increase from 32 bits
 Includes the required environment to crack passwords using GPGPU with openCL and CUDA configured 'out of the box'
 Built on hardened linux, including a hardened kernel and toolchain
 Hardened kernel with extra patches
 Uses a Pentoo overlay, which allows tools to be built on top of a standard Gentoo build
 Support for full disk encryption with LUKS if installed on HDD
 Automated installation

Tools 
Tools are installed with versioned ebuilds and open-ended ebuilds, making it possible to pull in the latest subversions and still have installs tracked by package management. The following tool categories are included:
 Analyzer
 Bluetooth
 Cracker
 Database
 Development
 Exploit
 Footprint
 Forensics
 Forging
 Fuzzers
 Misc
 MitM
 Pentoo
 Proxy
 RCE
 Scanner
 SIP-VOIP
 Wireless

Releases 
Pentoo uses rolling releases with periodic ISO snapshots of the latest committed updates.

References

External links 
 
 Official blog
 
Pentoo at OpenSourceFeed Gallery
 Shmoocon 2010 Firetalks Presentation: Pentoo
 BSides Delaware 2013 Presentation: Pentoo 
 Report Bugs
 Working betas

Gentoo Linux derivatives
Linux security software
Linux distributions without systemd
Pentesting software toolkits
Linux distributions